Epitonium jukesianum is a species of very small parasitic sea snail,  a marine gastropod mollusc in the family Epitoniidae, the wentletraps.

This snail is known to occur in intertidally and in shallow water in southeastern Australia and North Island, New Zealand.  It is also found along the coasts of Tasmania.

It parasitises on sea anemones and can reattach itself if it gets knocked off its host. It is known to occur in high turbidity environments, but is more common in areas with moderate to low turbidity.

References

 Powell A. W. B., New Zealand Mollusca, William Collins Publishers Ltd, Auckland, New Zealand 1979 , [[TasmanianMuseum&ArtGallery|

Epitoniidae
Gastropods of Australia
Gastropods of New Zealand
Gastropods described in 1852